Hart am Wind is an East German film. It was released in 1970.

External links
 

1969 films
East German films
1970s German-language films
Seafaring films
Films set in the Baltic Sea
1960s German films